Shimizusawa Dam  is a gravity dam located in Hokkaido Prefecture in Japan. The dam is used for irrigation and power production. The catchment area of the dam is 534.2 km2. The dam impounds about 87  ha of land when full and can store 5576 thousand cubic meters of water. The construction of the dam was completed in 1940.

References

Dams in Hokkaido